Hespèrion XXI is an international early music ensemble.  The group was formed in Basel, Switzerland in 1974 as Hespèrion XX by Catalan musical director Jordi Savall (bowed string instruments, particularly the viola da gamba), his wife Montserrat Figueras (soprano), Lorenzo Alpert (flute, percussion), and Hopkinson Smith (plucked string instruments).  The group changed its name to Hesperion XXI at the beginning of the 21st century. The name "Hespèrion" is derived from a word in Classical Greek which referred to the people of the Italian and Iberian peninsulas.

The ensemble is noted for its scholarship in early music, especially the music of 16th and 17th century of Spain. Their performance practice is noted for the liberal use of improvisation around the basic melodic and rhythmic structures of the early pieces, resulting in great emotional intimacy and immediacy.

Awards
 Grand Prix de l'académie du Disque Français
 Edison-Prijs Amsterdam
 Grand Prix du Disque of the Charles Cros Academy of France
 Grand Prize of the Japanese Recording Academy
 Cannes Classic Award
 Diapason d'Or
 Grand Prix FNAC
 Giorgio Gini Foundation Prize

Selected discography

As Hespèrion XX
Note:  The name of composer Juan del Encina (or Enzina) is spelled below as printed on the individual CD covers.

 1976 - Music from Christian and Jewish Spain, 1450-1550. Villancicos and romances from the cancioneros Colombina, Palacio, and Upsala; recercadas from the Trattado de Glossas; and sephardic romances from the Romancero.
 1978 - "Cansós de Trobaritz". A recording of songs of Catalan Troubadours.
 1979 - Llibre Vermell de Montserrat. A 14th century pilgrimage
 1991 - Juan Del Enzina: Romances & Villancicos, Salamanca, 1496. Works by Spanish composer Juan del Enzina honouring King Ferdinand II of Aragon and Queen Isabella of Castille. The lyrics express Spain's anticipated rise to greatness as adventurers, such as Columbus, set off to return the world's riches to the homeland, thereby assuring Spain's wealth and power.
 1991 - Lope de Vega: Intermedios del Barroco Hispanico, 1580-1680
 1993 - Matthew Locke, Consort of Fower Parts 1650-1660
 1998 - Elizabethan Consort Music 1558 - 1603, Works by Alberti, Parsons, Strogers, Taverner, White, Woodcoock & Anonymes
 1999 - El Barroco Hispánico
 2001 - Music for the Spanish Kings
 2001 - J. S. Bach: Die Kunst Der Fuge

As Hespèrion XXI
 2000 - Diáspora Sefardí, Alia Vox — a recreation of music of the Eastern Sephardic communities
 2002 - Ostinato, Alia Vox
 2004 - Isabel I: Reina de Castilla, Alia Vox
 2005 - Altre Follie, Alia Vox
 2006 - Orient-Occident, Alia Vox
 2008 - Estampies & Danses Royales: Le Manuscrit du Roi ca. 1270–1320, Alia Vox
 2009 - The Book of the Science of Music by Dimitrie Cantemir, Alia Vox
 2009 - Le Royaume Oublié: La croisade contre les Albigeois – La tragédie Cathare, Alia Vox
 2011 - La Sublime Porte: Voix d'Istanbul, 1430–1750, Alia Vox
 2013 - Esprit des Balkans, Alia Vox
 2016 - GRANADA 1013 - 1502, Alia Vox

References

External links
 Official Hespèrion XXI site
 Recordings of Hesperion XXI at Alia Vox, from Jordi Savall

Mixed early music groups
Musical groups established in 1974